This is a list of people affiliated with the Indian Institute of Technology Delhi.

Business

Politics and Law

Science and technology

Others 

Narinder Kumar Gupta,  honorary member in the area of impact mechanics of the International Society of Impact Engineering.
Predhiman Krishan Kaw, Founding Director of Institute for Plasma Research, first PhD graduate of IITD.
Kaustubh Khade, kayaker
Kiran Seth, founder of SPIC MACAY
Avinash Kumar Agarwal, mechanical engineer, Shanti Swarup Bhatnagar laureate
Rajdeep Grewal, distinguished professor of marketing at University of North Carolina at Chapel Hill
Rajat Gupta, managing director of McKinsey & Company, convicted of insider trading
Naveen Garg - theoretical computer scientist , Shanti Swarup Bhatnagar laureate .
Avinash Kak, professor of electrical and computer engineering at Purdue University
Subhash Kak, professor of electrical and computer engineering at Oklahoma State University
Devang Vipin Khakhar – chemical engineer, academic, Shanti Swarup Bhatnagar laureate
Pramod Maheshwari, chief executive officer, Career Point Ltd
Ashish Nanda, former director of Indian Institute of Management Ahmedabad & Robert Braucher Professor of Practice at Harvard Law School
Rahul Pandit, condensed matter physicist, Shanti Swarup Bhatnagar laureate
N. S. Satya Murthy – physicist, Shanti Swarup Bhatnagar laureate
Rajendra Pawar, co-founder, NIIT
Arogyaswami Paulraj, pioneer in MIMO, professor emeritus in the Dept. of Elect. Engineering at Stanford University
Surendra Prasad, communications engineer, Shanti Swarup Bhatnagar laureate
Sanjay Puri, statistical physicist, Shanti Swarup Bhatnagar laureate
Raghuram Rajan, former chief economist of IMF , former chief economic adviser to the prime minister of India ; 23rd governor of the Reserve Bank of India joined on 5 Sep 2013, Katherine Dusak Miller Distinguished Service Professor of Finance at the University of Chicago Booth School of Business.
Mohit Randeria, condensed matter physicist, Shanti Swarup Bhatnagar laureate
Sashi Reddi CEO and founder of AppLabs
Krishan Sabnani, Research VP at  Alcatel-Lucent Bell Labs, responsible for research on NFV and web communications
Amardeo Sarma, president German Sckeptics Society
Anurag Sharma – optical physicist, academic, Shanti Swarup Bhatnagar laureate
Vijay Thadani, co-founder, NIIT
Sudhanshu Vrati, vaccinologist, N-BIOS laureate
Vivek Gupta, President and CEO of Mastech Digital
Nandu Nandkishore, Former Executive Vice President and Head of Asia Oceania, Africa of Nestlé S.A, Switzerland

Notable faculty 

 Durai Sundar, computational biologist, N-Bios laureate
 Munish Chander Puri, professor emeritus of mathematics.
Vipin Kumar Tripathi, notable Indian Plasma physicist and professor emeritus of Physics.
Prof. Rajat K. Baisya, Founder, Project and Technology Management Foundation (PTMF)

References

External links

IIT Delhi
Indian Institutes of Technology people
Indian_Institute_of_Technology_Delhi_people